The India League was an England-based organisation that campaigned for the full independence and self-governance of India. The League was established in 1928 by Krishna Menon and has been described as "the principal organisation promoting Indian nationalism in pre-war Britain".

History
The India League emerged from the Commonwealth of India League, which was established in 1922 and itself emerged from the Home Rule for India League, established in 1916. When Menon became joint secretary of the Commonwealth of India League, he rejected its previous objective of dominion status for India and instead set the goal of full independence. During the 1930s, the organisation expanded and established branches in cities across Britain.

Members of the League were largely drawn from the British elite, although a branch was established in the East End of London in the early 1940s, in order to attract more supporters from the South Asian community there. According to historian Nicholas Owen, British audiences were reluctant to believe accounts of colonial repression and social conditions in India given by Indians, and so the League sent a British delegation to India to validate its arguments, resulting in the publication in 1933 of The Condition of India.

The organisation continued to operate after India's independence in 1947 and while it focused mainly on India, "the League was internationalist in its outlook throughout, perceiving India's struggle for freedom as part of a larger struggle against imperialism and capitalism". Following Indian independence, the organisation focused on fostering relations between the UK and India and supporting Indian immigrants in the UK. It held regular meetings at the India Club, London. Latterly, its public presence faded.

In 1947 it was reported that the minimum subscription to the India League was five shillings. Branches could be established by groups of five or more people, subject to the approval of the League's executive committee. Branches were required to pay £2 6 shillings per year to the executive committee.

References

Further reading
 
 
 

1928 establishments in the United Kingdom
Revolutionary movement for Indian independence